This article lists players who have captained the Tipperary under-20 hurling team in the Munster Under-20 Hurling Championship and the All-Ireland Under-20 Hurling Championship. Prior to 2019, the competition had an under-21 age limit.

List of captains

See also

List of Tipperary senior hurling team captains

References

External link

 List of Tipperary captains

 
Tipperary